Azzurra Volley San Casciano is an Italian women's volleyball club based in San Casciano in Val di Pesa and currently playing in the Serie A1.

Previous names
Due to sponsorship, the club have competed under the following names:
 Volleyball Arci San Casciano (1975–1986)
 Azzurra Volley San Casciano (1986–2004)
 Il Bisonte Azzurra Volley San Casciano (2004–2013)
 Il Bisonte San Casciano (2013–2014)
 Il Bisonte Firenze (2014–present)

History
After becoming  in 1986, the club start making progress in the lower Italian leagues arriving at Serie B2 and eventually reaching the Serie B1 in 2002. With the team showing good potential, the club search for sponsorship in order to fulfil it. In the following years, strong campaigns allow the club to compete for promotion to Serie A2 which was reached in 2012. Two seasons later the club was promoted to Serie A1, as a result, the home venue is changed to the Nelson Mandela Forum in Florence.

Team
The following is the roster for the 2022–2023 season.

References

External links

Official website 

Italian women's volleyball clubs
Volleyball clubs established in 1975
1975 establishments in Italy
Sport in Tuscany
Serie A1 (women's volleyball) clubs
San Casciano in Val di Pesa